The Narrow Scope of Things is the second album by the Christian rock band  Embodyment. It is the first album  not to feature original vocalist Kris McCaddon or rhythm guitarist James Lanigan. It is also the first to completely abandon the band's previous death metal influences, pursuing a more alternative rock style.

Critical reception

Jason D. Taylor reports "Overall, The Narrow Scope of Things was the turning point for Embodyment, and as it stands is their best record as well." Michial Farmer of The Phantom Tollbooth wrote: "Other songs, such as Pendulum attempt (rather unsuccessfully, in my opinion) to combine the band's new softer edge with hardcore.  In the end, though, if The Narrow Scope of Things is remembered for anything, it will be for the remarkable pop sensibilities and melodies crafted within."  Alex Figgis of Cross Rhythms writes "If you are looking for some intelligently written and deftly executed art, then look no further than The Narrow Scope Of Things."

Track listing

Personnel
Embodyment
 Sean Corbrary - Vocals
 Andrew Godwin - Lead Guitar
 Jason Lindquist - Rhythm Guitar
 Derrick Wadsworth - Bass
 Mark Garza - Drums

Production
 Barry Poynter - Engineer, Producer, Keyboards
 Jason Magnusson - Assistant Engineer, Additional Percussion, Backing Vocals, Producer
 David Johnson - Photography
 Don Clark -   Art Direction, Layout Design
 Brandon Ebel - Executive Producer

References

External links

Solid State Records albums
2000 albums
Embodyment albums